Melibe papillosa is a species of sea slug, a nudibranch, a marine gastropod mollusk in the family Tethydidae. This species is yellowish and somewhat translucent. The oral hood, which is large, has flattened hatchet-shaped cerata. It is found in the waters around Japan.

References

  Gosliner T.M. & Smith V.G. (2003) Systematic review and phylogenetic analysis of the nudibranch genus Melibe (Opisthobranchia: Dendronotacea) with descriptions of three new species. Proceedings of the California Academy of Sciences, (4) 54(18): 302-356.

External links
 Image
 Image

Tethydidae
Gastropods described in 1867